Arnaud Antoine Rene Bernard, better known by his stage name Onra, is a French hip hop beatmaker based in Paris. His musical style is a "chopped up set of RnB laden beats and electronically produced experiments laced with influences spanning the entire globe".

Biography
Arnaud Bernard was born in 1981 in Germany to French parents. His father is of Vietnamese descent. He moved with his family to France at the age of three. He discovered a passion for music at the age of ten and started making music at the age of nineteen. In 2000, he moved to Paris to pursue studies. He graduated from business school in 2006 with a degree in Marketing with the intention to create his own record label.

The first album was made in collaboration with producer and friend Quetzal (Al Quetz) in 2006, Tribute, a project inspired by soul music.

At the same time, he started collaborating with Byron the Aquarius, a keyboard player from Alabama, and released an album under the name Byron & Onra "The Big Payback" in 2007 on Japanese label Circulations. They also appeared on compilations such as Beat Dimensions and New Worlds by Jay Scarlett.

In 2006, he went to Vietnam for the first time, and brought back over 30 Chinese and Vietnamese records from the 60's and 70's. He made a collection of 32 tracks with this unique material and named it, Chinoiseries, an album that blends Hip-Hop and Chinese Pop Music influences.

In 2008, he was selected to attend the Red Bull Music Academy in Barcelona and shortly after, started touring all across Europe, USA, Asia and Australia.

In 2010, Onra released his latest LP Long Distance on All City Records. It features tracks with Olivier DaySoul, fellow French beatmaker Walter Mecca, and T3 from Slum Village, soul singer Reggie B and keyboard player Buddy Sativa.
It received press coverage from respected medias such as Pitchfork, which gave the album an outstanding 8.0/10, as well as Jay-Z's blog, LifeAndTimes.

In 2011, Onra released a second volume to Chinoiseries, called "Chinoiseries Pt.2" on All City Records, with Chinese Music Records found in China, Thailand and Vietnam. In 2012, Onra released his newest EP Deep In The Night on Fool's Gold Records.

Under the name Yatha Bhuta Jazz Combo, a collaborative project between Onra and fellow French producer Buddy Sativa, a self-titled album was released 8th (UK) and 9th (US) April 2013 consisting of 12 spiritual jazz tracks. These tracks are almost entirely improvised and were "created as a therapeutic break from their other constraining aliases, and not originally intended for public release."

On May 15, 2015, Onra released his fourth album called "Fundamentals", an album blending Hip-Hop and R'n'B, featuring different vocal guests such as Daz Dillinger, Black Milk and Do Or Die.

On March 10, 2017, Onra concluded the Chinoiseries trilogy, with a last volume called "Chinoiseries Pt.3" on All City Records

Discography

Studio albums

Present Tribute Bo Bun Records (2006)
Chinoiseries  (2xLP) Favorite Recordings (2007)
Chinoiseries (CD) Label Rouge Prod (2007); Bo Bun Records (2008)
1.0.8 (LP, CD) Favorite Recordings, Bo Bun Records 2009
Long Distance (2xLP, CD) All City Records (2010)
Chinoiseries Pt.2 (2xLP, CD) All City Records (2011)
Fundamentals (2xLP, CD) All City Dublin (2015)
Chinoiseries Pt.3 (2xLP, WEB) All City Records (2017)
Nobody Has To Know (2xLP, CD, Tape, Web) All City Records (2018)

Singles & EPsThe Big Payback (12") Just Like Vibes (2007)Tribute EP (7", EP, White or Pink vinyl) Bo Bun Records (2007)My Comet / Shhhhhhh  (7", Ltd) All City Records (2008)Tribute EP II (7") Favorite Recordings (2008)Chinoiseries (7", Ltd) Favorite Recordings (2009)
 Deep In The Night (12") Fool's Gold (2012)
 Supreme Sound From Paris (feat. Walter Mecca) (12") Skullcandy Supreme Sound (2012)
 Over & Over'' (feat. Daz Dillinger and Do Or Die & Johnny P) (12") All City Records (2015)

See also 
 J Dilla
 Madlib
 DJ Mehdi
 Nujabes

References

External links

Professional reviews
 Long Distance Review on Pitchfork
 Love on the Beat on Life+Times
 Nobody Has to Know review, Atwood Magazine

French hip hop musicians
French electro musicians
Musicians from Paris
Living people
French people of Vietnamese descent
Year of birth missing (living people)